Lechenaultia floribunda, commonly known as free-flowering leschenaultia, is a species of flowering plant in the family Goodeniaceae and is endemic to the south-west of Western Australia. It is an openly-branched shrub or subshrub with crowded, narrow, fleshy leaves and compact groups of pale blue to pale mauve or creamy white flowers.

Description
Flowering occurs from August to December.

Taxonomy
Lechenaultia floribunda was first formally described in 1837 by George Bentham in Enumeratio plantarum quas in Novae Hollandiae ora austro-occidentali ad fluvium Cygnorum et in sinu Regis Georgii collegit Carolus Liber Baro de Hügel from specimens collected near the Swan River by Charles von Hügel. The specific epithet (floribunda) means "flowering profusely".

Distribution and habitat
Free-flowering leschenaultia grows in heath, scrub or woodland and is found in near-coastal areas between Kalbarri and Perth, and inland as far as Wongan Hills in the Avon Wheatbelt, Carnarvon, Geraldton Sandplains, Jarrah Forest, Swan Coastal Plain and Warren biogeographic regions of south-western Western Australia.

Conservation status
Lechenaultia floribunda is listed as "not threatened" by the Government of Western Australia Department of Biodiversity, Conservation and Attractions.

References

floribunda
Garden plants of Australia
Plants described in 1868
Taxa named by George Bentham
Flora of Western Australia